The 2020–21 season was 25th consecutive season in the top Ukrainian football league for Vorskla Poltava. Vorskla competed in Premier League and Ukrainian Cup.

Players

Squad information

Transfers

In

Out

Pre-season and friendlies

Competitions

Overall

Premier League

League table

Results summary

Results by round

Matches

Ukrainian Cup

Statistics

Appearances and goals

|-
! colspan=16 style=background:#dcdcdc; text-align:center| Goalkeepers

|-
! colspan=16 style=background:#dcdcdc; text-align:center| Defenders

|-
! colspan=16 style=background:#dcdcdc; text-align:center| Midfielders 

|-
! colspan=16 style=background:#dcdcdc; text-align:center| Forwards

|-
! colspan=16 style=background:#dcdcdc; text-align:center| Players transferred out during the season

Last updated: 9 May 2021

Goalscorers

Last updated: 9 May 2021

Clean sheets

Last updated: 9 May 2021

Disciplinary record

Last updated: 9 May 2021

Attendances

Last updated: 9 May 2021

References

External links
Official website

Vorskla Poltava
FC Vorskla Poltava seasons